The canton of Anizy-le-Château is a former administrative division in northern France. It was disbanded following the French canton reorganisation which came into effect in March 2015. Its population was 10,945 in 2012. It included the following communes:

Anizy-le-Château
Bassoles-Aulers
Bourguignon-sous-Montbavin
Brancourt-en-Laonnois
Cessières
Chaillevois
Chevregny
Faucoucourt
Laniscourt
Laval-en-Laonnois
Lizy
Merlieux-et-Fouquerolles
Monampteuil
Mons-en-Laonnois
Montbavin
Pinon
Prémontré
Royaucourt-et-Chailvet
Suzy
Urcel
Vaucelles-et-Beffecourt
Vauxaillon
Wissignicourt

Demographics

See also
Cantons of the Aisne department

References

Former cantons of Aisne
2015 disestablishments in France
States and territories disestablished in 2015